The Adept Airmotive 320T is a liquid-cooled V-6 engine for aviation use.

Specifications (320T)

See also

References

External links
 Adept Airmotive Corporate Video
 AVWeb Video

2010s aircraft piston engines